SS Canopic was a passenger liner of the White Star Line. 

The ship was built by Harland & Wolff in Belfast for the Dominion Line, and launched on 31 May 1900 as the Commonwealth. She could carry up to 1,300 passengers.

The ship initially operated between Liverpool and Boston, but in 1903 she was transferred to the White Star Line and renamed Canopic. Her first crossing for the White Star Line began on 14 January 1904, on which she sailed from Liverpool to Boston. Immediately after this first crossing, she joined the Romanic and Republic on the White Star Line's new Mediterranean service, on which she would remain for more than 13 years. She was requisitioned for war service between 1917 and 1919, then served on the Liverpool–Montreal route until 1925, when she was scrapped at Briton Ferry, Wales. Timber panelling from the dining hall was salvaged and installed in the former Canopic Restaurant at Mumbles from where it was later reinstalled in the town's White Rose hotel.

References

External links
Multiple images of the Commonwealth including interior

1900 ships
Ships built in Belfast
Ships of the Dominion Line
Ships of the White Star Line
Ships built by Harland and Wolff